Woolcott or Woollcott may refer to:

People
Alexander Woollcott (1887–1943), American critic and commentator
Peter Woolcott (born 1953), Australian public servant
Richard Woolcott (1927–2023), Australian diplomat, author and commentator
Roy Woolcott (1946–2018), English professional footballer
Sina Woolcott (1907–2003), New Zealand potter, born in Fiji
William W. Woollcott (1876–1949), American businessman

Other uses
Woolcott, Bracken County, Kentucky

See also
Walcot (disambiguation)
Walcott (disambiguation)
Wilcot
Wolcott (disambiguation)
Wolgot
Woolscott